Arthur James Lacey (20 May 1904 – 6 August 1979) was an English professional golfer who finished in the top ten of The Open Championship on four occasions in the 1930s. He also played in the 1933 and 1937 Ryder Cup matches, and was then selected as non-playing captain of the Great Britain and Ireland side for those matches in 1951. He was chairman of the PGA from 1949 to 1951.

Early life
Lacey was the son of another Arthur Lacey, the greenkeeper at Burnham Beeches Golf Club in Buckinghamshire. Arthur, senior was also a golfer, winning the first competition of the Golf Greenkeepers' Association at Bushey Hall Golf Club in 1912 with scores of 80 and 79. Arthur senior later moved to Ifield, West Sussex. Lacey had a younger brother Charles who was also a successful golfer.

Golf career
Lacey's most notable victories as a player came in the Belgian Open of 1931 and 1932, and the French Open in 1932, and he continued to be a regular high finisher in British professional events in the 1930s. 1937 was his most successful year winning the Yorkshire Evening News and Dunlop-Metropolitan tournaments and finishing seventh in The Open Championship, behind winner Henry Cotton but ahead of several of that year's American Ryder Cup side, including major champions Horton Smith, Ralph Guldahl, Sam Snead and Denny Shute.

Lacey was professional at The Berkshire Golf Club in Ascot, Berkshire from 1934 to 1952 having previously been at Selsdon Park (1928 to 1933), Leighton Buzzard Golf Club (1927 to 1928) and an assistant at Gerrards Cross Golf Club.

Lacey also served as a rules official, and in that capacity was involved in a controversial ruling during the final round of the 1958 Masters Tournament. He allowed Arnold Palmer, who was in strong contention, to play two balls when Palmer's tee shot plugged in wet turf on the 12th hole. Palmer's original attempt from the plugged lie gave him a double bogey, while he made a par with his second ball after taking a free drop, which he had had to argue with Lacey to obtain. Palmer's actual score on the hole would be decided after further discussion. Bobby Jones ruled half an hour later that Palmer's par would count, and Palmer went on to win, ahead of a bitter Ken Venturi, who as Palmer's playing partner lost his composure when Palmer received the favourable ruling. The incident has been debated heavily in golf circles ever since.

Tournament wins
this list may be incomplete
1931 Belgian Open
1932 Belgian Open, French Open
1933 Yorkshire Evening News Tournament
1937 Yorkshire Evening News Tournament, Dunlop-Metropolitan Tournament

Results in major championships

Note: Lacey only played in The Open Championship.

NT = No tournament
CUT = missed the half-way cut
"T" indicates a tie for a place

Team appearances
Ryder Cup (representing Great Britain): 1933 (winners), 1937, 1951 (non-playing captain)
Seniors vs Juniors (representing the Juniors): 1928
England–Scotland Professional Match (representing England): 1932 (winners), 1933 (winners), 1934 (winners), 1936 (winners), 1937 (winners), 1938 (winners)
England–Ireland Professional Match (representing England): 1932 (winners), 1933 (winners)
Coronation Match (representing the Ladies and Professionals): 1937
Llandudno International Golf Trophy (representing England): 1938 (winners)
Great Britain–Argentina Professional Match (representing Great Britain): 1939 (winners, captain)

References

Alliss, Peter: "The Who's Who of Golf", (1983), Orbis Publishing Ltd. 

English male golfers
Ryder Cup competitors for Europe
People from Burnham, Buckinghamshire
1904 births
1979 deaths